Telenor Arena, sometimes referred to as Fornebu Arena, is a multi-purpose indoor arena located at Fornebu in Bærum, outside Oslo, Norway. It serves as a venue for a variety of events, including concerts, exhibitions, action shows, family shows, TV and sport. It has a capacity for 15,000 spectators for sports and 25,000 for concerts, including 40 luxury boxes and club seating for 1,200. The venue has a fixed roof and an asphalt floor. The venue was opened ahead of the 2009 Norwegian football season as a replacement for Nadderud Stadion. It cost 585 million Norwegian kroner (NOK) to build, of which NOK 300 million was for the sports venue. The arena will host the 2025 World Men's Handball Championship with the country, Croatia and Denmark including the final.

During the 2000s, Nadderud was below standards for play in the top national league. Fornebu was at the time undergoing an urban redevelopment; after several years of negotiations and public grants, Stabæk secured a lot in 2004. Construction started in 2007. In 2010, a disagreement arose between the club and venue-owner Kjell Chr. Ulrichsen, with the latter demanding that the team leave the venue to allow for more event revenue. Telenor Arena has hosted the Eurovision Song Contest 2010, as well as concerts by artists and bands of international fame, such as Madonna, Britney Spears, Tina Turner, Adele, Muse, Foo Fighters, Roger Waters (the Wall tour), Rihanna, Lady Gaga, Beyoncé, Jay-Z, Kanye West, Metallica, AC/DC, Black Sabbath, The Rolling Stones, Justin Bieber, Celine Dion and Drake. Telenor holds the naming rights.

History

Planning
Stabæk traditionally has played their home games at Nadderud Stadion, a municipal multi-purpose stadium at Bekkestua. Following the club's rapid ascent from lower divisions to the top league during the first half of the 1990s, Nadderud became in need of upgrades, resulting in a new main grandstand opening in 1996. The stadium remained severely lacking adequate facilities for professional football, and fell short of increasing requirements from the Football Association of Norway (NFF).

Originally, a redevelopment of Nadderud was proposed, but in 1999 Stabæk players launched the idea of building a new stadium at Fornebu, which became subject to an urban redevelopment project after the 1998 closing of Oslo Airport, Fornebu. The initial proposal was named Blue Dream Arena, would have seating for 25,000 spectators, blue artificial turf and a retractable roof. Other proposed amenities were movable seating which would also allow the stadium to both host athletics and be configured as an intimate football stadium. The idea called for Bruce Springsteen to hold a concert before the first match, which would be played against Barcelona. Several of the initial concepts of the stadium were never materialized. International rules disallowed blue artificial turf; instead, the flooring in the boxes were made in a blue, artificial turf-inspired material. Also the idea of having a retractable roof was discarded, both because of technical difficulties and cost issues.

In May 2001, Oslo City Council voted to sell their properties at Fornebu to Fornebu Boligspar (FB), which again had agreements to sell a lot for the stadium to Stabæk. In November 2002, Borgarting Court of Appeal concluded that Norrønafly had the right to continue leasing a hangar—located at the planned location of the venue—until 2014. In June 2003, Stabæk was in financial difficulties, and investor Kjell Chr. Ulrichsen bought shares for NOK 10 million to avoid bankruptcy; these shares had the option to be converted to shares in the arena company.

Fornebu Boligspar later determined that it was more profitable to build apartments at the arena site. Negotiations started between the club, the property company and Mayor Odd Reinsfelt. In November 2003, it was announced that a compromise was reached whereby Fornebu Boligspar would give the lot free to Stabæk, in exchange for a lot nearby. Two weeks later the compromise was rejected by FB. A new compromise was announced on 29 June 2004, whereby FB would give 50 million Norwegian krone (NOK) and a lot free to Stabæk in exchange for the commercial properties which would be part of the stadium. However, the following day the parties announced that they were not able to agree on the risk, as Stabæk demanded that FB take the full risk in the project.

Instead, Stabæk started negotiating with IT Fornebu to take over a lot they owned. They needed a  lot which would have a market value of between NOK 60 and 80 million, and Reinsfelt stated that the municipality was willing to help by "maneuver in gray areas within the margins". The club was further pressured by NFF, who were going to limit the exceptions allowed for Nadderud and other stadiums not meeting their criteria. On 29 October, FB and Stabæk signed an agreement whereby Stabæk received a free lot and NOK 50 million, in exchange for FB taking over the commercial properties. The condition was that the municipality allowed a more dense use of the rest of FB's area. This would require a re-regulation of the area, and Reinsfelt estimated that it would not be possible for construction to start until 2006. In November, UEFA changed the rules for artificial turf to state that it had to be green. Until Stabæk's proposal was made, UEFA had not thought that anyone would build a pitch with a non-green turf, and representatives stated that it was because of Stabæk the rule change was made. The plans were nearly terminated in October 2006, after discussion about the planned Fornebu Line—a people mover which would connect Fornebu to Lysaker—stopped the regulation plan. However, in November the final permissions were granted by Bærum Municipality. On 22 December, Stabæk announced that the financing was secured.

Construction

Architects were HRTB and the main contractor was NCC Construction. While domed stadiums have been common in North America, no such stadiums of comparable size of Telenor Arena had previously been built for football in Europe. Construction started by demolishing a hangar, which was completed in February 2007. However, because of the building boom, concrete elements needed for construction to start meant that the rest of the construction was delayed. The cornerstone was laid on 5 September.

In June 2008, Stabæk announced they had signed an eleven-year sponsorship agreement with the telecommunications company Telenor, where the latter would pay up to NOK 115 million for the sole naming rights for the arena, in addition to tickets and access to executive boxes. In March 2009, the retailing property was sold from Scandinavian Property Development to KLP Eiendom. The plans called for twenty to twenty-five football games, four to eight concerts, three to four large sports events and two other large events and conventions per year. Because of larger seating capacity, an all-seating arrangement, higher attendance and VIP facilities, Stabæk is able to generate three times the matchday revenue from Telenor Arena as Nadderud. The stadium is plagued with traffic problems on matchdays, with large crews hired to create temporary barriers to direct the crowds. The bus stops closest to the venue are closed, and a large number of police officers have to direct the traffic. These are costs which have to be carried by the arena company, and contrasts to matches at the nearly twice as large Ullevaal, where no such measures are necessary.

Football versus event controversy
In October 2009, ten individuals bought the operation company of the club and signed a 40-year lease for the use of the arena for Stabæk's home matches, as well as the right to use the facility for certain other activities. This contract has a revenue of NOK 9 million per year. In 2009, Stabæk Holding had a deficit of NOK 66.1 million, while Stabæk Fotball lost NOK 23.6 million. To keep the operating company running, Ulrichsen increased the company's share capital by NOK 73 million from late 2009 through late 2010.

On 4 November 2010, Stabæk Holding stated that they were near a bankruptcy, and that they intended to throw out Stabæk as a tenant, remove the turf and instead use the venue exclusively for events. Chair Diderik Schnitler in Stabæk Holding stated that the business model was not sustainable. The football schedule was not made until early in the year, while in the event business, bookings were common one to two years in advance. It was therefore difficult to secure lucrative events, as large parts of the year had to be held in reserve in case the venue was needed for yet-to-be scheduled matches. The holding company stated that they might have to file for bankruptcy. Stabæk Fotball stated that they had a 40-year contract to use the venue.

Stabæk's director of sports, Inge André Olsen, stated that returning to Nadderud was not an option, as it had too little capacity and insufficient facilities. Should Nadderud be used, it would have to be rebuilt, with new grandstands under roofs, VIP seating, a new parking house and new change room, which would cost NOK 100 million. Because of building permits, construction would take two to three years. Nadderud is also not approved to host games in the Premier League, so Stabæk would have to either play their games at Ullevaal Stadion in Oslo or Marienlyst Stadion in Drammen. Telenor stated that if Stabæk moved, they would have to re-negotiate the naming rights agreement for the arena, as the value of the contract was largely based on the naming exposure of Stabæk playing in the Premier League. The company also stated that they had difficulty understanding the argumentation from the holding company, as there was no football being played October and March, but that the venue, which has the largest capacity for indoor concerts in the Oslo area, failed to attract large artists, such as Rihanna, during the winter months.

On 4 December, Stabæk Fotball stated that they were willing to move their training, Norwegian Football Cup and UEFA matches to either Nadderud or Ullevaal, as a compromise to free up more available time in the arena. This was rejected by NFF, who stated that the licensing rules required that a club's main arena be available for all league, cup and UEFA matches, and that a general exemption would not be given for the cup. In mid-December, Stabæk Fotball started the process of a judicial registration of the right to lease the venue, which was permitted according to the contract. This would grant Stabæk Fotball the right to continue to lease the venue even if the holding company went bankrupt. A preliminary injunction for this was granted by Asker and Bærum District Court.

In a 16 December statement, three Stabæk Fotball officials said that they suspected that Ulrichen's plan all along was to convert the venue to a pure convention center, and that the use as a football venue was a decoy to get a free lot worth up to NOK 200 million plus grants worth NOK 50 million. The book value of the venue was NOK 303 million at the end of 2010, although a statement from the district court stated that the value of the venue was significantly lower than that. The bank DnB NOR held at the time a mortgage with security in the property worth NOK 260 million, while Ulrichsen through his investment company held a mortgage worth NOK 60.1 million.

On 7 January 2011, the parts announced that they had reached a compromise. Stabæk would remain at Telenor Arena for at least the 2011 season. In addition, the club held an option to take over the responsibility for events at the venue. Stabæk Fotball had until 30 June to accept the option, which would allow the club to remain at the venue on a permanent basis. This would require them to invest NOK 20 million in an event administration, which would increase event revenue, but at the same time move the risk from Stabæk Holding to Stabæk Fotball. If the club declined the option, they would not be allowed to play at the venue from the 2012 season. On 30 June, Stabæk announced that they would not fulfill the option to continue renting the stadium. The necessary NOK 35 million would entail a risk the club was not willing to take. The club stated that they hoped they could remain at the stadium by establishing a foundation which could purchase the venue form Ulrichsen. If this does not work out, the club will have to relocate from the 2012 season. The club is then considering relocating back to Nadderud, to Ullevaal or to Marienlyst. The club estimates that any relocation would result in the club losing half their revenue. Stabæk played its last match at Fornebu Arena on 20 November 2011, losing 1–2 against Haugesund. Subsequently, the pitch was removed, and Stabæk returned to Nadderud from the 2012 season.

The Norwegian Handball Federation announced in May 2013 that the arena would be used for a four-nation men's handball tournament, Bring Cup, in November. The federation stated that they would use the tournament to evaluate if the venue was suitable as a new national arena for handball. The venue received mixed reviews. The tournament saw low attendance and Danish commentator Bent Nyegaard criticized the arena for being too large. The federation was happy with the arena, and stated that were planning on using it for finals in their bid for future World and European Handball Championships. Telenor Arena was part of the Oslo bid for the 2022 Winter Olympics, in which it had been proposed to be used for short track speed skating and figure skating.

Facilities

The venue is owned and operated by Fornebu Arena AS, which is again owned by Stabæk Holding, which also owns Stabæk Fotball. Telenor, Norway's largest telecommunications company, holds the naming rights for the stadium. The venue has seating for 15,000 spectators for football, and 25,000 for concerts. This includes club seating for 1,200, 40 luxury boxes and a restaurant which can seat 800. The venue has a considerably lower heating cost than similar conventional halls because the warm air is stored in the building's concrete and steel elements, and using the inert energy created by the spectators. The venue is the largest indoor stadium in Northern Europe.

The venue is owned and operated by a conglomerate of six companies all owned by Kjell Christian Ulrichsen. The mother company for the other companies is Stabæk Holding AS. Fornebu Arena AS is the actual owner of the real estate. Fornebu Event AS is responsible for renting out the venue for concerts, conventions and other non-sporting events. FA Leie AS partially leases and partially owns installed facilities in the venue. Sameiedrift Widerøeveien nr. 1 AS is the management company for the property as a whole. Arena Idrett AS hold the rental guarantee given to Fornebu Arena by the renters of the commercial properties and Sameiedrift Widerøeveien nr. 1.

Transport
Ruter bus 31 is a high-frequency service which runs from the city center of Oslo via Lysaker Station to Fornebu. During regular schedule it stops just outside the stadium; however, on matchdays it stops further away because of traffic. Lysaker Station is served by both the Oslo Commuter Rail and selected intercity and regional trains. Dedicated football buses are operated by Ruter to Stabæk home games. There are 1,500 parking spaces immediately near the venue, although additional parking is available at IT Fornebu and at Lysaker, which are a seven- and fifteen-minute walk away, respectively. The Fornebu Line is under planning, and would be built either as a light rail or a rapid transit, which would allow rail transport from the city center of Oslo and Lysaker to the stadium.

The arena often gets uncomfortably hot when the capacity is full and the organisers were criticized for the water priced at 44 NOK (approximately $7,2) for a cup with water.

Sports 
Telenor Arena was between 2009 and 2011 the home ground for Stabæk Fotball, which plays in Eliteserien. The first match was a friendly against Sweden's IFK Göteborg on 24 January 2009. The official opening took place on 8 March, when it was host of Superfinalen 2009, a pre-season match between Stabæk as league champions and Vålerenga as cup champions.

Stabæk has played four UEFA tournament matches at Fornebu: against Tirana and Copenhagen during the qualification for the 2009–10 UEFA Champions League, against Valencia in the play-off for the 2009–10 UEFA Europa League, and against Dnepr Mogilev in the qualification for the 2010–11 UEFA Europa League. Stabæk's record attendance at Telenor Arena dates from 13 September 2009, when 13,402 people saw a league game against Rosenborg. The record in a UEFA game was 12,560, who saw the match against Copenhagen.

The following list shows the average, maximum and minimum attendance for Stabæk's home games in the Premier League. It also gives the rank among the average attendance for the Premier League teams.

Concerts

Other events 
Other events at the venue include the Solberg Extreme Motorshow, Oslo International Horse Show and Sensation.

See also
 List of indoor arenas in Norway
 List of indoor arenas in Nordic countries

Bibliography

Notes

External links

Official website 

Stabæk Fotball
Sports venues in Bærum
Football venues in Norway
Eliteserien venues
Indoor arenas in Norway
Covered stadiums
Sports venues completed in 2009
2009 establishments in Norway
Telenor